Arbianwala is a small village in the vicinity of Bhawana in Chiniot District, Punjab, Pakistan. 

It is located at 29°39'15N 71°31'40E with an altitude of 107 meters (354 feet).

This village is called Arbianwala because most of the population are from the Arbi tribe, a tribe of the southern Punjab. Other inhabitants of the village belong to Syed, Chuchkana, Naul, Chadhar, and Jappa tribes/ clans.

References

Villages in Chiniot District
Chiniot District